Jacob Schwingboth is a Canadian bicycle racer, currently with the H&R Block Pro Cycling team. In 2012, he won the BC Provincial Road Race.

References

1991 births
Living people
Canadian male cyclists